
Gmina Krokowa is a rural gmina (administrative district) in Puck County, Pomeranian Voivodeship, in northern Poland.

The gmina contains part of the protected area called Coastal Landscape Park.

Villages
Gmina Krokowa contains the villages and settlements of Białogóra, Brzyno, Dąbrowa, Dębki, Glinki, Górczyn, Goszczyno, Jeldzino, Karlikowo, Kartoszyno, Karwieńskie Błoto Drugie, Karwieńskie Błoto Pierwsze, Kłanino, Krokowa, Łętowice, Lisewo, Lubkowo, Lubocino, Minkowice, Odargowo, Odargowo-Kolonia, Parszczyce, Parszkowo, Piaśnica, Połchówko, Porąb, Prusewo, Sławoszynko, Sławoszyno, Słuchowo, Sobieńczyce, Sobieńczyce-Myśliwka, Sulicice, Świecino, Szary Dwór, Trzy Młyny, Tyłowo, Wierzchucino, Wybudowania Odargowskie, Żarnowiec and Zielony Dół.

Neighbouring gminas
Gmina Krokowa is bordered by the town of Władysławowo and by the gminas of Choczewo, Gniewino, Puck and Wejherowo.

References
 Polish official population figures 2006

Krokowa
Puck County